Raka Zehtabchi is an Iranian-American filmmaker best known for her 2018 Academy Award-winning documentary short Period. End of Sentence, which addresses the topic of period poverty. Her previous film, Madaran, was an Iranian-language short about an Iranian mother who must decide whether to spare the life of her son's killer. Zehtabchi is the first Iranian-American woman to win an Academy Award. After the success of Period. End of Sentence, Zehtabchi collaborated with Planned Parenthood and We Testify to make a short film addressing abortion stigma, which was released in 2020. Her newest short film, Long Line of Ladies, premiered at the 2022 Sundance Film Festival. The film won the award for Best Documentary Short at SXSW 2022.

References

External links

Directors of Best Documentary Short Subject Academy Award winners
Living people
American feminists
American film directors
American people of Iranian descent
American women film directors
Feminist artists
Iranian film directors
USC School of Cinematic Arts alumni
Year of birth missing (living people)
21st-century American women